Dirk Wolf (born 4 August 1972) is a German former professional footballer who played as a midfielder. Wolf is best known for playing in the Bundesliga with Eintracht Frankfurt and Borussia Mönchengladbach. Since his retirement, he has held coaching and managerial jobs at 1. FC Germania 08 Ober-Roden and TS Ober-Roden.

References

External links
 
 
 

Living people
1972 births
Sportspeople from Marburg
Germany under-21 international footballers
Association football midfielders
German footballers
Eintracht Frankfurt players
Borussia Mönchengladbach players
FC St. Pauli players
FSV Frankfurt players
SV Darmstadt 98 players
Bundesliga players
2. Bundesliga players
Regionalliga players
Footballers from Hesse